Żuławka may refer to:

Żuławka, Greater Poland Voivodeship
Żuławka, Pomeranian Voivodeship

See also
Żuławka Sztumska, a village in Pomeranian Voivodeship